Ashley Diana Morris (born December 7, 1988) is a Canadian model and actress. In 2013, she became the newest Guess model after an accidental discovery in Vancouver. Morris was attending a concert by country music artist Dierks Bentley when she was spotted by fashion photographer Odette Sugerman (Guess, Vogue), who happened to be sitting a few rows away. Sugerman arranged for Morris, who had never modeled before, to fly to Los Angeles to meet Guess designer and co-founder Paul Marciano and to test for the clothing brand. Soon after, Morris signed with Guess. Her initial work with Guess will be for the company's lingerie and bikini campaigns.

Morris was also chosen by Hello! Magazine to represent one of the 50 Most Beautiful Stars in 2013.

Morris in 2015 was picked to play the role of Rebecca Romijn in the movie The Unauthorized Full House Story which aired on August 22 on the Lifetime Network.

Personal life
Morris broke her nose when she was younger and had surgery done on it when she was a teenager.  She told RAW Beauty Talks she chose to do the surgery because it was something that really bothered her and that she is still very happy about making that choice.

Morris, who has a degree in theatre and English literature from the University of Toronto and a diploma in sports journalism from Centennial College, had a role on Global TV's short-lived Canadian teen drama series The Best Years.

Morris met Vancouver cosmetic dentist  Geoffrey Gillespie through the dentist's friend, who first encountered Morris while she was working as a bartender at Toronto steakhouse in 2010. On November 9, 2013, Morris and Gillespie wed in the Bahamas.

Filmography

References

External links

https://m.imdb.com/name/nm1696434
Ashley Diana Morris on Twitter
Ashley Diana Morris on Instagram

1988 births
21st-century Canadian actresses
Actresses from Toronto
Female models from Ontario
Canadian television actresses
Centennial College alumni
Living people